Stage 12 of the 2012 Vuelta a España was contested on 30 August, and the race concluded with Stage 21 on 9 September. The second half of the race was situated entirely within Spain; starting with a medium mountain stage from Vilagarcía de Arousa to the Mirador de Ézaro in Dumbría, before four summit finishes and, ultimately, the customary race-concluding ride into Madrid.

Having held the lead of the Vuelta since the fourth stage, Joaquim Rodríguez of  maintained his lead into the second half of the race. On the twelfth stage, Rodríguez achieved his second stage victory after out-lasting his rivals for the general classification on the steep climb to Mirador de Ézaro in Dumbría, putting another twelve seconds onto his lead over  rider Alberto Contador. After the breakaway succeeded the following day, Rodríguez achieved another stage victory on the fourteenth stage to the Puerto de Ancares, where the longer climbs started to come into force in the race as part of three summit finishes in three consecutive stages. Similar to the move at the Mirador de Ézaro, Rodríguez accelerated away from his closest competitor, Contador, extending his race lead to 22 seconds.

Rodríguez and Contador remained together for most of the race's queen stage, the first finish at the Cuitu Negru; on gradients approaching 25% in places, Rodríguez gapped Contador by two seconds, with a four-second time bonus ultimately leaving the gap at twenty-eight seconds post-stage and into the second and final rest day of the race. Following the rest day, Contador turned the advantage around with a surprise attack around midway through the stage. He left his rivals for the overall behind, and soloed to the stage victory. Rodríguez struggled during the stage, being dropped by another one of the race contenders, Alejandro Valverde, and fell to third in the overall standings behind Contador and Valverde. Contador maintained the lead of the race until the end, eventually winning the race for a second time by 1' 16" over Valverde. Rodríguez was third, a further 21 seconds behind, with no other rider within ten minutes of Contador at the end of the race. Valverde took final-day victories in the points and combination sub-classifications, with Rodríguez losing the points competition in Madrid for the second year running after losing out to Bauke Mollema in 2011.

Stage 12
30 August 2012 — Vilagarcía de Arousa to Mirador de Ézaro, 

The second half of the race commenced with a rolling stage starting in the Province of Pontevedra at Vilagarcía de Arousa, before it made its way into the Province of A Coruña and an ultimate summit finish at the Mirador de Ézaro. Mini-attacks set the course of the early running of the stage, with the field remaining as a whole for most of the first two hours of racing after several attacks were closed down within minutes.

It was not until the  mark that an attack was allowed to gain substantial ground off the front of the main field. Despite an attack by Astarloza's team-mate Igor Antón,  were able to set Rodríguez up for his second stage victory of the race, with Alberto Contador coming across the line eight seconds behind, having been the last rider to have been dropped by Rodríguez, to limit his deficit to thirteen seconds after time bonuses had been applied.

Stage 13
31 August 2012 — Santiago de Compostela to Ferrol, 

Despite its  parcours being lumpy and undulating, the thirteenth stage was categorised as a stage for one of the sprinters to achieve a victory on, and potentially their last chance of a stage win until the following week as up until the rest day, the following three stages would all have summit finishes. Ferrol was hosting the race for the first time since 1993, when Djamolidine Abdoujaparov won the penultimate stage of that year's race. Much like the previous day's stage, mini-attacks set the course of the early running, with the field remaining as a whole for most of the first hour of racing after several attacks were closed down within minutes.

However, just after the  mark, a group did form and was allowed to make a gap off the front of the field. Seven riders representing six teams –  were the only squad to have two riders in the group – and achieved a lead of four minutes during the stage, with the peloton unwilling to let the advantage to anything larger. 's Cameron Meyer bested Juan Antonio Flecha for second place, four seconds behind Cummings, with the peloton led home by Degenkolb finished forty seconds behind Cummings.

Stage 14
1 September 2012 — Palas de Rei to Puerto de Ancares, 

The race returned to the mountains for the first of three consecutive summit finishes, that were expected to alter the general classification standings. Instead of the short, punchy climbs that had featured in the race prior to the fourteenth stage, longer climbs were included in the stage's  itinerary. The climb also contained a downhill section of around a kilometre in length, just after halfway up the climb.

A four-rider move initially got clear in the opening kilometres of the stage, but they were brought back before  of the parcours had been completed. After that, a larger group consisting of sixteen riders, including the four-time defending mountains classification winner David Moncoutié and fourth stage winner Simon Clarke of  advanced forward. The leaders held a lead of over three minutes at one point, with the break splitting apart on the Alto Folgueiras de Aigas, and on the descent, Alberto Losada – Rodríguez's team-mate in the break – ventured off the front on his own. The peloton had reduced the gap to two minutes by this point, and were continuing to close the gap gradually as they reached the bottom of the final climb of the stage.

 maintained station at the front of the peloton, with Contador being paced by three of his team-mates, and his rivals Rodríguez and Valverde were in close order to him. With the pace being accelerated, the peloton was being reduced in numbers, with only the race contenders remaining after a time. Froome cracked on the climb at one point, but managed to recover sufficiently to rejoin the leaders' group – having caught and passed Losada – before eventually falling off the back again, eventually losing 50 seconds, falling to 1' 41 behind, after time bonuses were applied. Contador made one last bid for victory, but Rodríguez had enough to combat the move, and eventually accelerated away from him and won his third stage of the race, gapping Contador by five seconds, and added nine seconds to his overall lead.

Stage 15
2 September 2012 — La Robla to Lagos de Covadonga, 

For the second of the three consecutive summit finishes, the riders had to negotiate two categorised climbs – as well as the unclassified Puerto de Pajares – before the final  climb, categorised as a climb of "Categoria Especial", to Lagos de Covadonga. Although the final climb was less steep in gradient compared to the climb before it, the Alto del Mirador del Fito – 7% compared to the latter's 8.3% – it reached 15% in places. In the early kilometres of the stage, a group of nineteen riders formed the early hallmarks of a breakaway group, before it was eventually established with ten riders in the group, as the peloton negotiated the windy conditions of the stage.

Kashechkin tried to launch the first attack on the climb to Covadonga, but was brought back by 's Pablo Lastras; a second move by  rider Antonio Piedra was more successful, and he continually pulled away from his breakaway companions, eventually winning the stage – his team's first at the Vuelta – by over two minutes. Valverde moved up to third overall, as 's Chris Froome lost 35 seconds to the lead trio.

Stage 16
3 September 2012 — Gijón to Valgrande-Pajares–Cuitu Negru, 

The last stage before the second and final rest day of the race, the sixteenth stage of the race was set up as the toughest day of climbing in the entire race, and as a result, was deemed the queen stage of the race. During its  parcours, there were three categorised climbs and a fourth, to the finish, at Cuitu Negru; the climbs got harder as the stage wore on, with a third-category ascent of the Alto de la Cabruñana first, followed by the first-category climbs of the Puerto de San Lorenzo (8.5% gradient) and the Alto de la Cobertoria, a climb with an average gradient of 8.6%. The climb to Valgrande-Pajares and beyond to Cuitu Negru – a "Categoria Especial" climb just like the previous day's finish at Lagos de Covadonga – averaged 6.9% over its , but was much steeper in the final few kilometres, reaching almost 25% in places. Unlike previous years, the stage finished on a newly repaved section of road, just for the race, rather than finishing in Valgrande-Pajares.

Mini-attacks set the course of the early running of the stage, with the field remaining as a whole for most of the first hour of racing after several attacks were closed down within minutes. It was not until the descent of the first climb of the day, the Alto de la Cabruñana, that an attacking move was allowed to be established; the riders that instigated it, were Thomas De Gendt of  – the winner of the queen stage at May's Giro d'Italia, at the Stelvio Pass – and  rider Dario Cataldo. De Gendt and Cataldo quickly gained a substantial advantage over the rest of the field, picking up a lead of almost fourteen-and-a-half minutes while ascending the day's second climb at the Puerto de San Lorenzo. as the peloton negotiated the windy conditions of the stage. Behind, 's Simon Clarke kept a hold of his mountains classification lead, by accelerating out of the peloton to take the points on offer for third at the summit of the climb.

Contador and Rodríguez rode tactically up the climb, and eventually managed to rid themselves of both Valverde and Quintana. However, their battles were only good enough for the places from third to sixth, as Cataldo and De Gendt stayed away from the field by over two-and-a-half minutes. Cataldo won the stage, as De Gendt ultimately cracked on the final climb, and gapped him by seven seconds to take his first Grand Tour stage win. Rodríguez extended his overall lead to 28 seconds over Contador, after gaining the third-place time bonus at the finish.

Stage 17
5 September 2012 — Santander to Fuente Dé, 

Prior to that, there were two other categorised climbs during the stage – both in the second half of the stage – with the third-category Collado de Ozalba and the second-category Collado La Hoz also on the itinerary for the stage,  in length. The stage was ideally suited for rouleurs and not the overall contenders, who would be looking at the penultimate-day stage to the summit finish at Bola del Mundo, as their only remaining attempt to gain time before the finish the next day, in Madrid.

Mini-attacks set the course of the early running of the stage, with the field remaining as a whole for most of the first two hours of racing after several attacks were closed down within minutes. At one point, the overall leaders were in two separate groups with Alberto Contador and 's Alejandro Valverde both in the group ahead of Joaquim Rodríguez before Rodríguez's  squad closed the gap. Eleven riders representing eleven different teams eventually formed the day's breakaway after , with team-mates of both Contador and Valverde in the group. Their lead never hit much more than three minutes, before splitting on the Collado de Ozalba, and  rider Arnold Jeannesson moved up from the peloton to join the leaders. A chase group formed on the descent from the climb, with three of Contador's team-mates among them. With the gap at 1' 14" to the leaders at the foot of the Collado La Hoz, Contador attacked out of the peloton.

Rodríguez and Valverde tried to chase him, but Contador made it up to the lead group before the top of the climb. His team-mates helped push the gap up on the roads, while Rodríguez was struggling to react to the pace and only had Alberto Losada for support in the chasing group. Contador attacked again just before the intermediate sprint point at Potes, and only his former team-mate Paolo Tiralongo was able to follow him. They held a two-minute gap over their closest rivals; Rodríguez was dropped on the lower slopes of the climb, as he was unable to follow Valverde, while Contador had gone solo off the front with around  remaining. With help from team-mates Nairo Quintana and Beñat Intxausti, Valverde cut the advantage to Contador on the climb, but could not catch him. Rodríguez came across the line tenth, 2' 38" in arrears, dropping to third overall behind new leader Contador and Valverde, who moved up to second.

Stage 18
6 September 2012 — Aguilar de Campoo to Valladolid, 

Valladolid was hosting the Vuelta for the first time since the 2008 edition of the race, when  rider Wouter Weylandt won the seventeenth stage in a sprint finish.

Unlike recent days, the breakaway was formed immediately after the start of the stage.  rider Luis Ángel Maté, 's Gatis Smukulis and Martijn Keizer of  attacked in the opening metres, and were later joined by Brent Bookwalter and 's Gustavo César; none of the five riders were any threat in the general classification, as Maté was the best-placed of the quintet in 50th place overnight. They managed to achieve an advantage of over five minutes at one point during the stage, but they were all brought back inside of  remaining in the stage. British national champion Ian Stannard tried to lead it out for team-mate Ben Swift, but Daniele Bennati made up ground on Swift, and ultimately edged him out at the finish line by inches for his sixth Vuelta stage victory. Bennati later dedicated his first victory in almost a year to former team-mate Weylandt, who was killed during the 2011 Giro d'Italia.

Stage 19
7 September 2012 — Peñafiel to La Lastrilla, 

Much like the previous day's stage, there were no categorised climbs during the day and although more undulating than the eighteenth stage, it was still expected to potentially bring about a sprint finish at the end; however, an uphill finish in La Lastrilla made it equally capable of producing a result that would favour some of the puncheurs in the race, like Philippe Gilbert or 's former race leader Joaquim Rodríguez, or even a breakaway to succeed on a rare occasion. Almost from the start, two of the wildcard teams had riders go out of the peloton and attack off the front, as 's José Vicente Toribio and  rider Aitor Galdós initiated the breakaway, quickly mustering a healthy advantage. The duo's advantage went up at a rapid pace, reaching its maximum of over ten minutes less than a quarter into the stage. Several teams took up station on the front of the main field; some to bring back the gap for the sprinters, while others to set one up for their puncheurs.

Rain started to fall at the halfway point of the stage, but the gap between the leaders and the pack continued to gradually fall until they were eventually caught with  remaining. An accelerated pace by the  helped to split the peloton in Navas de Riofrío, with Valverde and Rodríguez both eventually taking bonus seconds at the intermediate sprint point in Hontoria. Several late-race attacks came and went, before Gilbert's stage-winning attack out of the peloton in the closing kilometre. He held on to his second victory of the race ahead of Valverde, Daniel Moreno and Rodríguez. The rest of the field were led in three seconds later by 's Gianni Meersman; among the group was race leader Alberto Contador, who lost 17 seconds on the day to Valverde, but remained 1' 35" clear overnight in the general classification.

Stage 20
8 September 2012 — La Faisanera Golf to Bola del Mundo, 

The penultimate stage of the Vuelta was seen as the final chance for the riders to take substantial amounts of time in the race, with the final stage being the customary ride into Madrid. The parcours of  contained no fewer than five categorised climbs, all rated as a second-category climb or higher, with the summit finish – the tenth of the race – to Bola del Mundo being the highest-categorised of the five, as a "Categoria Especial"; the Bola del Mundo was also the highest point of the race, with the stage winner receiving the Cima Alberto Fernández award. The Bola decided the race for overall honours on its previous appearance in the race – in 2010 – as Vincenzo Nibali shadowed Ezequiel Mosquera up the climb, therefore winning the race by 41 seconds from Mosquera; Mosquera was later stripped of his results in late 2011.

Also among the group was the leader of the mountains classification, Simon Clarke, who was looking to all but guarantee winning the blue polka-dot jersey. Indeed, Clarke took maximum points at the first three climbs during the stage, as the breakaway held a lead of around eight minutes – having reached a maximum of over ten minutes at one point – over the main field. The lead group started to splinter on the climb itself, with six riders going clear in the early stages, before three riders – 's Richie Porte,  rider Kevin De Weert and former Vuelta overall winner Denis Menchov of  – established themselves with the accelerated pace.

In the peloton, 's Igor Antón initially attacked without chase, before Alejandro Valverde forced an attack on his rivals, trying to get clear before he was closed down. De Weert was dropped by his two lead companions, while the overall leaders had managed to break out into a group of their own with Valverde, Alberto Contador and Joaquim Rodríguez being paced by Rodríguez's 's team-mate Daniel Moreno. Their team-mate Menchov won the stage – 's fourth of the race – as he dropped Porte in the closing metres; six other members of the breakaway also crossed the line before the race contenders. Rodríguez was ninth on the stage, taking 25 seconds on Valverde – who was tenth – and he claimed back 44 seconds on Contador, who finished twelfth. In the general classification, Contador maintained his race lead, by a reduced margin of 1' 16", over Valverde, with Rodríguez another 21 seconds in arrears.

Stage 21
9 September 2012 — Cercedilla to Madrid, 

The Vuelta concluded with the now-customary stage finish in the centre of Madrid. The stage had an easy start – with a long and gradual descent from the start town of Cercedilla – before ten high-speed laps of a  circuit, followed by the sprint finish. In keeping with tradition, the final stage began at a slow pace, and was a largely ceremonial procession on the run into Madrid. After that, the main break was initiated by six riders on the opening lap of the Madrid circuit.

Lagutin was the last to be caught, just as the peloton started their final lap.  took up affairs on the front of the peloton, looking to get their sprinter Ben Swift a victory in the race but it was  who set up their sprinter with the best run to the finish line. Having fended off the advances of Italian pairing Elia Viviani and Daniele Bennati, it was John Degenkolb that took his fifth stage victory of the race. Further behind, 's Alberto Contador finished within the peloton to take his second Vuelta overall title, while Simon Clarke also confirmed his victory in the mountains classification. For the second year running, Joaquim Rodríguez lost the victory in the points classification on the final day, as a sixth place stage finish for 's Alejandro Valverde allowed Valverde to overhaul Rodríguez's points tally by six. As a consequence of this, Valverde also claimed the combination classification on a tie-break, due to his second place overall finish to Rodríguez's third.

Notes

References

12
Vuelta a España stages